The Circuit International Automobile Moulay El Hassan (also known as Marrakech Street Circuit and Marrakech Racetrack) is a  temporary street circuit in Agdal district, Marrakech, Morocco. The circuit is operated by MGP. It has a capacity of 10,000 spectators.

History

MGP’s partner in Morocco, D3 Motorsport Development, was given the responsibility of the design of the street circuit. It is the same architect company that designed the Surfers Paradise Street Circuit in Australia. Groupe Menara oversaw the construction on the Route de l'Ourika/Boulevard Mohammed based track. The paddock had been paved alongside the walls of the Royal Garden and more than 2,500 concrete impact blocks and many debris fence panels had been put in place to bound the track.

The third round of the 2009 WTCC season was held there on 3 May 2009, becoming the first international car race in Morocco since the 1958 Moroccan Grand Prix at the Ain-Diab Circuit in Casablanca and the first event for the WTCC in Africa.

The original circuit had a very simple layout. It was a  flat oval circuit with a hairpin at one end and chicanes punctuating the straights, running in an anticlockwise direction. In December 2015 it was announced the circuit would undergo a major overhaul to make it more challenging. Only half of the original circuit was utilized when the new layout came into effect for the 2016 FIA WTCC Race of Morocco.

Lap Records

The official race lap records at the Circuit International Automobile Moulay El Hassan are listed as:

Events

 Former
 Auto GP (2012–2014)
 FIA Formula Two (2010)
 Formula E Marrakesh ePrix (2016, 2018–2020, 2022)
 World Touring Car Championship FIA WTCR Race of Morocco (2009–2010, 2012–2017)
 World Touring Car Cup FIA WTCR Race of Morocco (2018–2019)

Results

Formula E

WTCR

WTCC

AutoGP

Notes

References

External links
 WTCC Official website
 Circuit's Official website
 Map and circuit history at RacingCircuits.info

Motorsport venues in Morocco
Sport in Marrakesh
World Touring Car Championship circuits
Formula E circuits
Marrakesh ePrix